Eulimella arabica is a species of sea snail, a marine gastropod mollusk in the family Pyramidellidae, the pyrams and their allies.

Description
The whitish shell has a narrow yellowish band. Its length measures 5 mm. It is shining and translucent. It is very minutely decussated. The 12-13 whorls of the teleoconch are flattened. The suture is impressed and shows a margin.

Distribution
This species occurs in the Red Sea.

References

External links
 To World Register of Marine Species

arabica
Gastropods described in 1869